Le Compte Wildlife Management Area is a Wildlife Management Area in Dorchester County, Maryland.

External links
 Le Compte Wildlife Management Area

Wildlife management areas of Maryland
Protected areas of Dorchester County, Maryland